Gastrodia vescula, commonly known as small potato orchid, is a leafless terrestrial mycotrophic orchid in the family Orchidaceae. It has a very thin, brittle, light brown flowering stem with up to three pale brown flowers that are white on the inside. It is only known from a small area near the border between South Australia and Victoria.

Description 
Flowering occurs from November to December.

Taxonomy and naming
Gastrodia vescula was first formally described in 1991 by David Jones from a specimen collected in a nature reserve near Mount Gambier in 1988. The description was published in Australian Orchid Research. The specific epithet (vescula) is a Latin word meaning "little" or "trifling" referring to the habit of this orchid.

Distribution and habitat
The small potato orchid is only known from small area in the far southeast of South Australia and far western Victoria where it grows in dense, heathy forest.

References 

vescula
Plants described in 1991
Terrestrial orchids
Orchids of South Australia
Orchids of Victoria (Australia)